Ivor John Seemley (30 June 1929 – 1 November 2014) was an English professional footballer who played as a left back in the Football League for Sheffield Wednesday, Stockport County, and Chesterfield and in non-League football for Ilkeston Town and Sutton Town.

Career
Born in Sheffield, West Riding of Yorkshire, Seemley started his career with his boyhood club Sheffield Wednesday, progressing through the youth teams to turn professional shortly after his 17th birthday in 1946. He had to wait a while for his debut for the club, making his first appearance in December 1953. He was part of the side that reached the FA Cup semi-final in 1954, eventually losing 2–0 to Preston North End. He left in the summer of 1955 to join Football League Third Division North side Stockport County, having made 23 appearances in all competitions. He was first choice left-back for the two seasons he spent at Edgeley Park making 81 league appearances. In 1957 he joined divisional rivals Chesterfield in exchange for Billy Sowden. He was a first team regular for Chesterfield making 77 league appearances before retiring from professional football in 1959. He later dropped into non-league football with Ilkeston Town and Sutton Town.

Personal life
After retiring from full-time football he worked at a sales office for a steel company in Sheffield. He died on 1 November 2014 in Sheffield at the age of 85.

References

1929 births
2014 deaths
Footballers from Sheffield
English footballers
Association football defenders
Sheffield Wednesday F.C. players
Stockport County F.C. players
Chesterfield F.C. players
Ilkeston Town F.C. (1945) players
Ashfield United F.C. players
English Football League players